Djibasso is a department or commune of Kossi Province in western Burkina Faso. Its capital lies at the town of Djibasso. According to the 1996 census the department has a total population of 46,674.

Towns and villages

References

Departments of Burkina Faso
Kossi Province